Cam Thomas (born May 5, 1991) is an American football cornerback who is currently a free agent. He was signed by the Bills as an undrafted free agent in 2015. He played college football at Western Kentucky. He spent the 2015 season with the Buffalo Bills.

College career
Thomas was with Western Kentucky from 2010-2014.

Professional career

Buffalo Bills
Thomas was signed by the Buffalo Bills as an undrafted free agent following the 2015 NFL Draft.

Thomas was cut by the Bills on April 18, 2016, after being on the PUP List all of the 2015 season.

References

External links
ESPN player profile

1991 births
Living people
African-American players of American football
American football cornerbacks
Buffalo Bills players
Western Kentucky University alumni
Players of American football from Paterson, New Jersey
21st-century African-American sportspeople